ATC-0175 is a drug used in scientific research, which is a selective, non-peptide antagonist at the melanin concentrating hormone receptor MCH1. In animal studies it has been shown to produce both anxiolytic and antidepressant actions, but without sedative or ataxic side effects.

References

Antidepressants
Anxiolytics
Quinazolines
Benzamides
Fluoroarenes